Dorcadion abstersum is a species of beetle in the family Cerambycidae. It was described by Holzschuh in 1982. It is known from Turkey.

See also 
 Dorcadion

References 

abstersum
Beetles described in 1982